Tamatoa IV, also named Moe'ore Teri'itinorua Teari'inohora'i (1797–1857) was the king of Raiatea from 1831 to 1857. He was temporarily deposed and exiled from 1853 to 1855 when Raiatea was ruled by a district chief named Temari'i before being restored.

References

Bibliography 

1797 births
1857 deaths
French Polynesian royalty
Oceanian monarchs
People from Raiatea
Converts to Protestantism from pagan religions